Euproctis kanshireia is a moth in the family Erebidae. It is found in Taiwan.

References

Moths described in 1910
Lymantriinae
Moths of Taiwan